Jaci Velasquez is the self-titled second studio album by Contemporary Christian singer Jaci Velasquez. It was released in 1998 on Myrrh Records.

Track listing

Track information and credits were taken from the CD liner notes.

Singles

 "Glory" - No. 1
 "God So Loved" (A videoclip was made for this song)- No. 1
 "Speak for Me" - No. 1
 "Show You Love" - No. 1

Charts

Certifications

References

External links
 Listing on official site
 Listing at Jesus Freak Hideout

1998 albums
Jaci Velasquez albums
Myrrh Records albums